The 2016 Four Nations Tournament (Torneio Quatro Nações) in Portuguese, was the third edition of the Four Nations Tournament held in São Bernardo do Campo, Brazil between 4–6 November as a Men's friendly handball tournament organised by the Brazilian Handball Confederation.

Results

Round robin

Final standing

References

External links
Tournament page on CBHb official web site

Four Nations Tournament (handball)
Four Nations Tournament
2016 in Brazilian sport
Four